The Fugitive Sheriff is a 1936 American Western film directed by Spencer Gordon Bennet and starring Ken Maynard, Beth Marion and Walter Miller.

Cast
 Ken Maynard as Ken Marshall 
 Beth Marion as June Roberts 
 Walter Miller as Flamer Willis 
 Hal Price as Louder Lucas 
 John Elliott as Judge Roberts 
 Arthur Millett as John 
 Virginia True Boardman as Mrs. Roberts 
 Frank Ball as Prospector 
 Edmund Cobb as Wally

References

Bibliography
 Pitts, Michael R. Western Movies: A Guide to 5,105 Feature Films. McFarland, 2012.

External links
 

1936 films
1936 Western (genre) films
1930s English-language films
American Western (genre) films
Films directed by Spencer Gordon Bennet
Columbia Pictures films
American black-and-white films
Films scored by Lee Zahler
1930s American films